Tocasta is  a genus of moths, belonging to the subfamily Agonoxeninae. It has been included in the Coleophoridae and Tineidae in the past. It consists of only one species, Tocasta priscella, which is found in Panama.

References

Agonoxeninae
Moths of Central America
Moth genera